The Hatfield School District or Hatfield Public Schools was a school district headquartered in Hatfield, Arkansas.

It operated Hatfield Elementary School and Hatfield High School.

On July 1, 2004, the district was consolidated into the Mena School District.

References

Further reading
 Map of Arkansas School Districts pre-July 1, 2004
 (Download)

External links
 

Defunct school districts in Arkansas
2004 disestablishments in Arkansas
School districts disestablished in 2004
Education in Polk County, Arkansas